The cabinet of Jakov Nenadović was formed on 31 December 1810 after the dismissal of Mladen Milovanović. It held office until 11 January 1811, when it was dismissed and replaced by the cabinet of Đorđe Petrović, who was also the head of state of Revolutionary Serbia at the time.

Timeline 

On the New Year's Day in 1810, voivode Jakov Nenadović brought in around six hundred armed men into the Assembly of Uprising Champions in order to force Karađorđe to dismiss Milovanović as the president of the Governing Council. Nenadović succeeded and successfully became the president of the Governing Council. With the Assembly of Uprising Champions, it represented the authority in Revolutionary Serbia. The government organized and supervised the administration, economy, judiciary, foreign policy, order, and the supply of arms for Serb forces. The government's headquarters were in Belgrade.

Composition 
The cabinet was composed of 6 members and two secretaries.

Aftermath 
On 11 January 1811, Đorđe Petrović, more commonly known as Karađorđe, entered the Assembly of Uprising Champions and removed Nenadović from power by proclaiming a constitutional act that would ensure him absolute military and political power.

References 

Cabinets of Serbia
1810 establishments in Europe
1811 disestablishments in Europe
Political history of Serbia